Grandview is a village in Sangamon County, Illinois, United States. The population was 1,441 at the 2010 census. It is part of the Springfield, Illinois Metropolitan Statistical Area.

Geography
Grandview is located at  (39.816950, -89.620313).

Demographics

As of the census of 2000, there were 1,537 people, 648 households, and 417 families residing in the village. The racial makeup of the village was 93.49% White, 4.75% African American, 0.20% Native American, 0.07% Asian, 0.20% from other races, and 1.30% from two or more races. Hispanic or Latino of any race were 0.52% of the population.

There were 648 households, out of which 27.3% had children under the age of 18 living with them, 45.4% were married couples living together, 13.9% had a female householder with no husband present, and 35.5% were non-families. 28.2% of all households were made up of individuals, and 11.4% had someone living alone who was 65 years of age or older. The average household size was 2.37 and the average family size was 2.89.

In the village, the population was spread out, with 23.6% under the age of 18, 7.5% from 18 to 24, 30.3% from 25 to 44, 21.5% from 45 to 64, and 17.1% who were 65 years of age or older. The median age was 38 years. For every 100 females, there were 94.1 males. For every 100 females age 18 and over, there were 86.6 males.

The median income for a household in the village was $36,349, and the median income for a family was $39,485. Males had a median income of $27,697 versus $22,279 for females. The per capita income for the village was $17,499. About 8.6% of families and 12.3% of the population were below the poverty line, including 22.3% of those under age 18 and 6.1% of those age 65 or over.

Notable people
 Robert Carter (born 1945), justice of the Illinois Supreme Court from 2020 to 2022.

References

Villages in Sangamon County, Illinois
Villages in Illinois
Springfield metropolitan area, Illinois